The men's 10,000 metres at the 1958 European Athletics Championships was held in Stockholm, Sweden, at Stockholms Olympiastadion on 19 August 1958.

Medalists

Results

Final
19 August

Participation
According to an unofficial count, 22 athletes from 16 countries participated in the event.

 (1)
 (1)
 (1)
 (2)
 (1)
 (1)
 (1)
 (2)
 (2)
 (1)
 (2)
 (1)
 (2)
 (2)
 (1)
 (1)

References

10000 metres
10,000 metres at the European Athletics Championships
Marathons in Sweden